Príncipe de Asturias Peak is the peak rising to 4498 m in Vinson Massif, Sentinel Range in Ellsworth Mountains, Antarctica, and surmounting Branscomb Glacier to the west-northwest, Roché Glacier to the north and Tulaczyk Glacier to the southwest.

Location
US mapping in 1961, 1988 and 2007.

See also
 Mountains in Antarctica

Maps
 Vinson Massif.  Scale 1:250 000 topographic map.  Reston, Virginia: US Geological Survey, 1988.
 D. Gildea and C. Rada.  Vinson Massif and the Sentinel Range.  Scale 1:50 000 topographic map.  Omega Foundation, 2007.
 Antarctic Digital Database (ADD). Scale 1:250000 topographic map of Antarctica. Scientific Committee on Antarctic Research (SCAR). Since 1993, regularly updated

Notes

References
 Bulgarian Antarctic Gazetteer. Antarctic Place-names Commission (in Bulgarian)
 Basic data (in English)
 Príncipe de Asturias Peak. SCAR Composite Gazetteer of Antarctica

External links
 Príncipe de Asturias Peak. Copernix satellite image

Ellsworth Mountains
Mountains of Ellsworth Land
Four-thousanders of Antarctica